Peter McCarthy may refer to:

 Peter McCarthy (American film producer), film producer, director, screenwriter, and actor
 Peter J McCarthy, Irish filmmaker, producer, photographer and artist
 Peter McCarthy (industrialist) (1845–1919), American manufacturer, businessman and philanthropist from Troy, New York
 Pete McCarthy (1951–2004), English comedian, radio and television presenter and travel writer.
 Peter McCarthy, drummer with Big Tom and The Mainliners